John Sinclair CBE (1860 – 9 December 1938) was a British physician who served as Chief Medical Officer to the General Post Office from 1913 to 1920.

Sinclair was born in Mancetter, Warwickshire, the son of Edward Sinclair, a Scot from Morayshire. He was educated at Oswestry School and trained as a doctor at the London Hospital. In 1884 he joined the Medical Department of the GPO and was promoted to Second Medical Officer in 1890 and Chief Medical Officer in 1913. He was awarded a Doctor of Medicine (MD) degree by the University of Durham in 1900.

He was appointed Commander of the Order of the British Empire (CBE) in January 1920 for his work in the First World War.

He married Hester Deacon in 1908. He died at Cheltenham in 1938.

Footnotes

References
Obituary, The Times, 12 December 1938
Biography, Who Was Who

1860 births
1938 deaths
People from Warwickshire
People educated at Oswestry School
Alumni of the London Hospital Medical College
Alumni of Durham University
20th-century English medical doctors
Commanders of the Order of the British Empire
Civil servants in the General Post Office